Mestwin II ( or Mszczuj II) ( 1220 – December 25, 1294) was a Duke of Pomerelia, member of the Samborides dynasty. He ruled Pomerelia as a sole ruler from 1273 to 1294.

Early life
Mestwin II was the son of Swietopelk II and the Přemyslid dynasty princess Eufrozyna. As a young man, in 1243 he was taken into the Teutonic Order custody as a hostage, part of the ceasefire agreement between his father and the Order, but the Order did not keep their part of this agreement and failed to return Mestwin II who was held by them until 1248 (for some time in the Order castle in Austria) when finally released.

Acquiring power
Most likely upon returning from Teutonic Order captivity his father made Mestwin II the Duke of Świecie (Schwetz) province circa 1250, and upon his father's death  he began his challenge against his younger brother for Gdańsk (Danzig) in 1266, starting the so-called Pomerelian Civil War that lasted until 1273. He fought his younger brother and uncles until he emerged victorious and finally became the principal Pomerelia prince and sole ruler in 1273. He united all the lands of Pomerelia (after the death of his uncles, Sambor II, prince of Lubiszewo (Lübschau) and Racibor Białogardzki, prince of Białogarda.

Alliances
In 1269, while searching for allies, Mestwin II entered into an alliance with expanding at the cost of Slavic lands and  ever aggressive Brandenburg margraves,  Treaty of Choszczno, and most likely in return for military and financial help he gave oath of fealty and  paid homage over a couple Pomeralian towns (Świecie and Białogard) to these dukes.

Mestwin's brother Wratislaw II of Pomerania, principal Pomerelian duke and ruler of Gdańsk (Danzig), was forced out of his duchy by Mestwin II and most likely his new ally in 1271. This action resulted in Wratislaw II and Sambor II military action against Mestwin II, and his own knights and nobles rebelled against him. Surrounded by adversity and even taken prisoner (for a short time in 1270) Mestwin II gave the possession of Gdansk to the Brandenburg duke Conrad who was holding the city of Gdansk until Mestwin II forced them to resign from their possession of the city by use of force in 1273, having been strengthened by new alliance with his maternal cousin Bolesław Pobożny, the duke of Great Poland. Defeated Wartislaw II found refuge with Ziemomysł of Kuyavia, the duke of Inowrocław and sought assistance from the Order, but he died unexpectedly in Wyszogród in 1271. The remaining male relatives of Mestwin II, his uncles Sambor II and Racibor, allied with the Order and various Piast princes, lost their possession within the Pomerelia due to Mestwin II actions against them, and also sought refuge with the Order and their daughters in Kujawy (Sambor) and Śląsk (Racibor). Both uncles died in the 1270s leaving  Mestwin II the sole ruler of all unified Duchy of Pomerelia. Now he was faced with challenges from Brandenburg, the Order, Pomeranian and Piast princes. As a result of the Order actions he was forced to give his castles and villages on the right bank of Vistula to them, and also the important left bank Pomerelian stronghold of Gniew, willed to the Order by his uncle Sambor II, a claim Mestwin II recognized under duress and Papal mediation in 1282.  These pressures forced Mestwin II to tighten his alliance with Greater Poland's Bolesław and his successor Przemysł II.

Treaty of Kępno
Mestwin II and Przemysl II, new duke of Greater Poland and future king of Poland, concluded the Treaty of Kępno in 1282 that was at first kept secret. The treaty, confirmed by magnates and nobles of both duchies, made both Mestwin and  Przemysł II either a successor per donatio inter vivos or  successor in all his possessions. It is known that Mestwin II remained the Pomerelia ruler until his death in 1294. It seems that the treaty of Kępno in fact unified Pomerelia and Greater Poland, starting the long process of reunification of Polish principalities by the Piast dynasts. During the life of Mestwin II nobles and magnates of Greater Poland received grants and appointments to Pomerelian offices and estates. In 1287 both princes entered into another successor treaty in Słupsk, and there they included in their succession treaty another Western Slavic prince, Bogusław IV of Szczecin (Bogislaw IV, Duke of Pomerania). This treaty was confirmed and  arrangement made public in Nakło, in 1291. These treaties resulted directly  from aggressive policies of March of Brandenburg and the Teutonic Order against the territories of these Slavic duchies and provinces.

Relations
He had three wives. First came princess Judith, daughter of Ditrich I duke of Brenna i Wettin, who died before 1275, then he married Piast princess Euphrosyne of Opole circa 1275 and they divorced in 1288, and finally married rather unknown Sulisława who died in 1292. He had two daughters: Katarzyna (Katherine), who married Pribislaw II, and Eufemia, eventually married to a Slavic or German prince.

He died in Gdańsk and was buried in the Cistercian Oliwa monastery. His own sarcophagus did not survive, most likely having been destroyed when the army of Gdańsk burned down the abbey during their rebellious war against king Stephen Báthory in 1577.  However, the cumulative sepulcher of the Samboride dynasty still remains, founded in 1615 by one of the Oliwa abbots, Dawid Konarski.

References

John Brown Mason, The Danzig Dilemma; a Study in Peacemaking by Compromise, 1946 
 Theodor Hirsch, Max Töppen, Ernst Gottfried Wilhelm Strehlke: Scriptores Rerum Prussicarum: Die Geschichtsquellen der preussischen Vorzeit, 
 Marian Gumowski: Handbuch der polnischen Siegelkunde, 1966 

1220s births
1294 deaths
Dukes of Pomerania
Samborides